Andamooka is a town 600 km north of Adelaide in the Far North of South Australia on the lands of the Kuyani and Kokatha people. Andamooka is famous for high-quality crystal seam opal, opalised fossils, and stargazing.  Andamooka recently featured in Vogue Magazine's "Best Country Towns in Australia to visit next" 'For a real taste of the outback, Andamooka has what you need. The town's observatory has your star-gazing needs taken care of, but you can also go 'opal noodling', essentially fossicking for the gems in a town that was once a hub for the opal mining industry.'

 Andamooka Crystal Opal is a luxury brand and is renowned as being the finest quality opal in the world.  
 Andamooka opal is the most stable of Australian opal in that it does not fade, craze, or crack.
 South Australia's only known dinosaur Kakuru kujani was discovered in Andamooka.
 Andamooka is the Gateway to 'Ngarndamukia' Lake Torrens National Park, to the 'Outback' via the Borefield Road / Oodnadatta Track to William Creek, Marree, Oodnadatta, and further. Ngarndamukia is a sacred site to the Kokatha, Kuyani, Barngarla, and Adnyamathanha people and is the second-largest salt lake in Australia, spanning over 200 km in length and 30 km wide. 
 Opal mining in Andamooka is deemed to be ethical since an Indigenous Land Use Agreement (ILUA) has been signed by the Kokatha People, relevant government authorities, and the opal miners who are working on the Andamooka Opal Fields.
 Andamooka is home to Karkaroo the juvenile opalised Andamooka Plesiosaur. Andamooka is on the edge of the ancient Eromanga Sea. During the Cretaceous period, the vast ocean's gradual retreat saw large-scale opalisation of a wide array of prehistoric marine life, including giant reptiles and other creatures swimming and roaming the shoreline, and shallow seawater.
 Andamooka is the largest town administered by the Outback Communities Authority instead of a local government area. It is in the state electoral district of Giles and the federal Division of Grey.

About

 Aboriginal people have lived in this area depending on the supply of fresh water for thousands of years. Aboriginal groups lived in this area during good seasons to take advantage of the prolific plant and animal resources.  Campsites in the Roxby Downs dune fields have been dated to 19,000 years ago, and Aboriginal people have continuously occupied South Australian deserts since at least that time.
 Andamooka lies on Kuyani traditional land. The name is derived from a salt lake, named from the Aboriginal "Andemorka", by which the locality was known to Europeans as early as 1866, well before opal was discovered.  At that time (1866) it was also known as 'Swinden's Country', after Charles Swinden of Riverton, the leader of the small horseback party which discovered it in 1857. They described it as a tract of 'generally sterile country but having some patches of good pastoral land' resulting in the foundation of Andamooka Station
 On the 29th August 1930, a thunderstorm led to the discovery of opal "floaters" on One Tree Hill by boundary riders Sam Brooks and Roy Shepherd. The field was worked for 2 years in secret.
 According to Alan Treloar and Oxy Nugent it was Paddy Evans who 'spilled his beans' about the discovery of opal at One Tree Hill while drunk in Port Augusta. 
 Whilst the lure of opal did entice the first settlers to Andamooka some others came for more complex reasons. It seems the "free"' and largely ungoverned lifestyle of this outback town held an attraction for many people who were leaving Europe after experiencing the horrors and constrictions of war. 
 Andamooka is one of the most accessible opal fields in Australia.  A short drive from Olympic Dam Airport and a quick flight from Adelaide
 Andamooka is highlighted  in the South Australian Tourism Commission's Outback' campaign : 3 Nights in Andamooka: Opals, Fossils, and Astronomy
 The Andamooka Observatory has been recognised by the South Australian Tourism Commission as one of the Best Places to Stargaze in South Australia 
 Andamooka is famous for Opalised Fossils of marine tetrapods (Plesiosaurs: Pliosaurids and Elasmosaurids), Ichthyosaurs, Belemnites (ancient Cephalopods), and shells.
 Andamooka is home to Karkaroo, the juvenile opalised Andamooka Plesiosaur at the Andamooka Opal Showroom Underground Opal & Mineral Museum. Karkaroo came to reside in Museum in August 2018. The colourful opalised bones of this juvenile plesiosaur were found in the false level (8.5 meters) at Tea Tree in October 2016. Karkaroo is thought to have lived during the early Cretaceous period (Lower middle Aptian), 115 million years ago, in shallow seas.
 South Australia's only known dinosaur Kakuru kujani was dug up in Andamooka. Kakuru is a genus of theropod dinosaur that lived 110 million years ago during the early Cretaceous Period. The fragmentary opalised tibia was found in the Aptian Marree Formation. Kakuru appeared to have been about 1-2m in length and Kakuru is shown to be distinct from any known theropod. 
 The centrepiece of the South Australian Museum Opalised Fossil Gallery is the priceless opalised skeleton of a six-metre-long Addyman Plesiosaur found in an opal mine in Andamooka in 1968. It is the finest known opalised skeleton on Earth.
 The famous Opallionectes andamookaensis (meaning "the opal swimmer from Andamooka") is a 5 m (16 ft) long plesiosaur, which is thought to have lived during the early Cretaceous period (Lower middle Aptian), 115 million years ago, in shallow seas was found in the Andamooka
 In the 2021 census, Andamooka had a population of 262 people.
 Andamooka is off the grid. Power is generated by a 1650 kW diesel power station that supplies a local mini-grid
 Andamooka used to have to rely on water supplies trucked in from Roxby Downs, or above-groundsterns for the limited rainfall of the region. In 2005 a pipeline was built from Olympic Dam to Andamooka, from which, water is carted to residential water tanks.
 In summer Andamooka can be one of the hottest places on Earth.
 A total of 193 bird species and 45 different reptiles are in the region.
 Until 2015, Andamooka was the only Australian city where none of the streets were named.
 24-hour petrol and diesel supply.
 Wi-Fi is available at the Andamooka School Library and the Community Hall.
 Telstra phone reception only (no Vodaphone or Optus reception).
 Telstra landline telephone booths on Dodgy Drive and Andamooka Post Office.
 No bus service operates between Pimba, Roxby Downs, Olympic Dam and Andamooka.
 Celebrate the 2022 Year of the Tiger by visiting the majestic life-sized Andamooka Tiger at Cal the Stoner's Stone Masonry Art Studio. The Andamooka Tiger has been described in May 2022 by InDaily Newspaper as joining the ranks of must-see big things on a tour of Australia. The Andamooka Tiger is made of Grampian sandstone. A life-sized tiger that has Andamooka Rainbow Matrix Opal eyes, teeth, claws, and the tip of the tail. The Andamooka Tiger was unveiled by former Federal Senator the Hon. Chris Schacht on the 16th of April 2022. The Andamooka Tiger unveiling event was supported by the Australian Government Regional Arts Fund, Country Arts South Australia, and Regional Arts Australia
 Andamooka will host the '2027 '13th Australian National Opal Symposium'. The internationally renowned Opal Symposium comes under the auspices of the National Opal Miners' Association (NOMA) an alliance between all the opal miners associations across NSW, Qld, and SA. The National Opal Symposium brings together, tourists, international buyers, miners, wholesalers, jewellers, opal enthusiasts, private collectors, and the government and keeps the scientific community interested in researching opal.
 Since the establishment of the nearby Olympic Dam copper-uranium mine and the town of Roxby Downs in the 1980s, some residents of Andamooka are now employed in the mine or Roxby Downs, and many others are retired.
 ·Increased global interest in opals and astronomy created by the Discovery show series 'Outback Opal Hunters', and the ABC's Stargazing Live. 
 Andamooka has had a significant spike in tourists due to interest created by the Discovery show series 'Outback Opal Hunters'. The series has sparked a local opal rush from the BHP mining towns Olympic Dam and Roxby Downs.  More and more people are coming to try their luck opal mining and working with locals to explore new ground.

Things to do in Andamooka

 Check out Karkaroo the juvenile opalised Andamooka Plesiosaur at the Andamooka Opal Showroom Underground Opal & Mineral Museum.
 Learn to look and mine for opal! The Andamooka Observatory tours provide the time and space to relax, learn about opal mining, observe the night skies, and soak up the elements.
 The Andamooka Observatory offer customised and extended stargazing and opal mining tours, private group tours, guided bus tours, and tag-along tours.
 Visit the majestic life-sized Andamooka Tiger at Cal the Stoner's Stone Masonry Art Studio.
 Stay and sleep over at the iconic Dukes Bottlehouse Motel.
 View displays of fine opal, art, and books at the Andamooka Opal Showroom Underground Opal & Mineral Museum.
 Feast on Andamooka cuisine at Dine-A-Mite café. Open Wednesday – Sunday 9 am –2 pm, Fridays 9 am-2 pm and 5 pm - 8 pm.
 Shop at the Best CWA Shop in Australia! the Andamooka CWA 'Boo-Teek' OP Shop (according to ABC's Peter Goers OAM) is Open Friday and Saturday mornings 9 am - 12 pm.
 Stock up on snacks & supplies available at the Dodgy Brothers Liquor Store! Open 7 days. 9 am –8 pm.
 Shop local at Desert Threadz, an environmentally friendly, eco-friendly, family-owned fashion store.
 While walking along Opal Creek Boulevard noodling for opal, cool down at the Splash Pad, visit the Arid Explorers Garden, and have snacks and coffee at Dine-A-Mite Café.
 Pay respects to early opal miners and frontiers folk at the old cemetery and new cemetery. Visit the Andamooka Cemetery on Boot Hill (new cemetery).
 Historic Cottages: 6 original semi-dugouts built along Opal Creek Blvd. These cottages were made by opal miners in the 1930s and are listed on the South Australian Heritage Register. Open all year round.
 Historic Machinery Display: This is a comprehensive and growing display of examples of machinery used by opal miners.
 Andamooka Lapidary Club, open on Saturdays and Sundays.
 4 x 4 drive to 'Ngarndamukia' Lake Torrens National Park.
 Visit Bills Pub at the White Dam Opal Diggings.
 Regular arts, live music, and public outreach astronomy events hosted by the Andamooka Observatory.
 Explore the town and Martian landscapes.
 The iconic Tuckabox Hotel temporarily has been closed since March 2020 and will reopen soon. The original Tuckabox Restaurant was built in 1960 and sold again in 1962 to an enterprising Steve Smirnios from Sydney who bought the site after looking at a set of photos. In 1985, Steve's son John Smirnios joins him in Andamooka to work at the Tuckabox. In 1987, Steve expanded and built a 'new' Tuckabox using volcanic rock.  This expansion took 2.5 years to complete. Steve retired in 2005.

Famous Andamooka Opal

 The Queen was given the Andamooka Opal, which is set into an ornate scrolled necklace made of diamonds, and a matching pair of earrings during her visit to Adelaide in 1954. The South Australian government wanted to present their new Queen with a stone their region was known for, and set about finding the best example in South Australia. The chosen gem came from the Andamooka Opal Fields and had been found in 1949. Known simply as the Andamooka Opal, it is thought to be the finest opal ever discovered and is praised both for the intensity of its colours and for its overall size. The opal was cut and polished by John Altmann to a weight of 203 carats. It displays a magnificent array of reds, blues, and greens and was set with diamonds into an 18-karat palladium necklet.
 One of the famous opals found at Andamooka was the "Andamooka Desert Flame". It was considered one of the largest blocks of opal discovered in Australia. It was originally bought for $168,000 dollars in 1969 and by 1970 was valued at over $1,000.000 dollars
 Andamooka opal "Opal Dress" is valued at $500,000 and housed at the South Australian Museum.
 The highly sought Rainbow Matrix Opal is only found in Andamooka. 
 Painted Lady – also known as Andamooka boulder opal.  The opal develops in fractures of Arcoona quartzite boulders. These command high prices as specimens.
 The Addyman Plesiosaur is "the finest known opalised skeleton on Earth".

Opal Mining

 Opal is mined in close proximity to the town and extends into 24 fields. 
 In November 2021 there were 120 opal mining claims in Andamooka.
 Currently, the most popular machine is the excavator, used after bulldozing overburden. Some shaft mining and decline mining with bobcats and noodling machines. 
 The original pick and shovel shaft miners, tools were upgraded in the 1960s and 70s by the arrival of miners using bulldozers which made deep cuts to reach the respective opal levels, from where horizontal drives could be made to fully exploit the level.
 Opal at Andamooka occurs in the shallow marine Bulldog Shale, part of the Marree Subgroup of Early Cretaceous age, which overlies Algebuckina Sandstone or laps directly onto pre-Mesozoic rocks.
 The opal level generally lies between 4m to 30m below the natural level of the topsoil
 Andamooka contains many variations of the host rock, including quartzite, shale, sandstone, and limestone. These variations in host rock make an incredible difference to how the opal is formed, making Andamooka material highly unique and producing the greatest number of opal variations in Australia.
 Opal miners use UV LED flashlight to noodle for opal at night especially after a rain and when there is no moon.
 New miners are FIFO workers and families from Olympic Dam, Roxby Downs (one of the youngest and wealthiest post codes in Australia) inspired by Outback Opal Hunters.

Pop Culture

 The 1979 film The Last of the Knucklemen  a classic meat pie western directed by Tim Burstall was filmed in Andamooka. There are remake rumours. It was performed Off-Broadway in 1983 at the American Theatre of Actors. This movie was made and released about six years after this film's source John Power 'The Last of the Knucklemen' play of the same title was first published and performed in 1973.
 The "Andamooka Opal" was presented to Queen Elizabeth II on the occasion of her first visit to Australia in 1954.
 The Andamooka (Queens) Opal features in Futurama S06E20"All the Presidents' Heads" episode of the sixth season.
 Andamooka is referenced in the Max Brooks novel, World War Z.
 Andamooka opal mining crews: the 'Mooka Boys' and the 'Andamooka Misfits' feature in the Discovery Channel's successful 'Outback Opal Hunters''. The 'Outback Opal Hunters' series has been broadcast in over 100 countries including in the United Kingdom on Quest and in the United States on Discovery Channel.
 2022, Peter 'the Oracle Taubers', the Andamooka Tiger and the Andamooka Observatory crew will appear in a new series called 'Opal Hunters: Outback Odyssey'.
 2021 Andamooka was a SA Top Tourism Town Finalist! Andamooka was nominated for the SA Top Tourism Town by the Roxby Downs Visitors Information Centre.
 2021 Germein perform at the Andamooka Community Hall.
 2021 'Cal the Stoner presents: The Good, The Twisted and The Unearthed' at the Roxby Downs Roxby Link Art Gallery.
 2021 Blacklight Eromanga Sea Exhibition at the Roxby link Art Gallery by Leila Day.
 2021 Peter 'the Oracle Taubers' presents 'Andamooka Alive' at the 2021 Australian 10th National Opal Symposium in Coober Pedy. The National Opal Symposium created a clear 20/20 vision for the future of Opal Mining. This event shared discoveries, new techniques, discussed the virtues of ethically sourced Australian opal and united to keep the industry and Australia's National Gem Stone flourishing.
 In 2020 and 2022 the Andamooka Observatory was recognised by the London-based international aerospace company Ultra Group for their STEM and Space-based tourism projects, public outreach astronomy, and community initiatives. In 2021, The Andamooka Observatory hosted the 'STEM under the Stars' initiatives, a variety of music and arts activities, stargazing events in Andamooka and Woomera and are collaborating with BHP, Inspiring SA, and the Roxby Downs Area school to search for new Extremophiles in the region: Tardigrade, Archaea, microbial communities, fossilised extremophile/fossil microbe / pre-historic formations / cyanobacteria and stromatolite.  The Andamooka Observatory regularly hosts public outreach astronomy, paleontology, and science-related events and projects including National Science Week projects and twice hosting the Japanese Space Agency, JAXA, Hayabusa2 Capsule Recovery Team.   
 2020 ' Kingdom Go' music video by Hasty Patience.
 2020 Eromanga Sea Experience with Death by Carrot & Leila Day.
 2019 The Andamooka Observatory's mining vehicle makes a solid appearance at Spuds Road House (Pimba) in the Tim Minchin TV series 'Upright'.
 2019 Andamooka Night Skies Tour & Camp Oven Cook-Out / National Science Week with ABC's Paul Culliver.
 2019 Death by Carrot & Leila Day – Down the Rabbit Hole Experience.
 2019 'Spare' music video by Luke Howard. The 'Spare' music video is a powerful first companion piece to 'The Sand That Ate The Sea,' film by writer & director Matthew Thorne. "There was something unique there in Andamooka; in the people – but also in the place. In the mysticism of the Opals themselves, but also this anthropological (or psychological) interest in what choosing to Opal mine says about people. What kind of people chose to move to the town at the literal end of the road? " "Making this film would not have been possible without the incredible inspiring community, land and partnership we were offered by the people of Andamooka. It really is unique, magic place - and that land and history (modern and old) is, I think, what Australia really is. It's the true frontier (and one of the last places of it) - and something that I think we need to engage with more as Australians. It is in our blood, and our heart - and I can't express how much working in the place and with the community gave me, and the film."
 2019 'Salt Flats' music video by Luke Howard, Lior, Shards.
 2019 'Light Ascending' music video by Luke Howard, Shards.
 2019 'Futura Coda' music video by Luke Howard, Lior, Shards.
 2019 'The Sand That Ate The Sea,' film by writer & director Matthew Thorne.
 2019 'Rear View Mirror' film by writer & director Jonathan May. "Strangely, both times upon returning to Sydney I've experienced reverse culture shock," he said. "The silence of the desert was so refreshing, a world without the hum of traffic, overpopulated with humans rushing around and trapped by the Western perception/illusion of time." I've enjoyed the company of genuine people connecting personally rather than via social media." "And while the place was somewhat desolate, I felt that people were more connected in contrast to those in cosmopolitan cities, who struggle with isolation." "It felt like I travelled back in time, but it also felt that I reset myself."
 2019 Minnie Berrington Documentary. Minnie Berrington was a typist from London, who became one of Australia's first female opal miners and Andamooka's first female postmistress. In 1958 Minnie wrote a book about her life called Stones of Fire: A Woman's Experience in Search of Opal. Minnie saw herself as a kind of Alice in Wonderland and wanted to call her memoir "My Dally in Wonderland". Minnie spent about 34 years working in South Australia's opal fields.
 Since 2018, on Tuesday mornings @ 9.20 am on ABC North and West SA 'Breakfast' Conan from the Andamooka Observatory talks about whats new in space news, stargazing, science, and astronomy on the ABC Listen App, Andamooka 105.9 FM, Coober Pedy 106.1 FM, Leigh Creek 1602AM, Maree 105.7 FM, Port Pirie 639 AM, Roxby Downs 102.7 FM.
 2018 Fanny Lumsden Country Halls Tour performance at the Andamooka Community Hall.
 2018 The Andamooka Outback and Opal Show was held in the heart of Adelaide's Chinatown. SA Trade and Investment Minister David Ridgway introduced initiatives to promote Andamooka opal and export opportunities. 
 'Dino-Rooka from Andamooka' a Children's book from artist and author Terry Aplin. The story of an opal-loving, hopping dinosaur from Andamooka. 
 2017 'Opal Dreamers' film by Lonely Oak Films.
 2016 Karkaroo the opalised juvenile Andamooka Plesiosaur was discovered.
 2016 'What's over there' book by Bron Cunningham. This book is about exploring Andamooka and Lake Torrens.
 2015 'Hiding to Nothing' music video by Bad//Dreems.
 2015 'South Aussie with Cosi" episode filmed in Andamooka.
 2007 'Andamooka Opal and Surrounding Area' DVD and book by Peter Taubers.
 1999 the ABC's 'The Money or the Gun' TV Show filmed a show on 'Madness' in Andamooka. Hosted by Andrew Denton.
 1996 the first website on Andamooka opal is developed and published by Desert Moon Opals.
 1995 Andamooka band 'Wraith' win SA Battle of the Bands.
 1990 EBE Volume 2: The Black Entity of Andamooka' by Jimmy Guieu was published. Guieu wrote the series "E.B.E." (for "Extraterrestrial Biological Entity"): E.B.E.: Alerte rouge (first part) (1990) and E.B.E.: L'entité noire d'Andamooka (second part) (1991) using as a plot Grey Aliens that became a common in UFO Conspiracy theories.
 1990 Bigfoot – one of the iconic motor vehicles from the Mad Max series was relocated to Andamooka and became known by its other name – the Andamooka Buggy. It was driven in the 1985 film, Mad Max: Beyond Thunderdome, by the character known as Ironbar Bassey, played by lead singer with popular 80s band Rose Tattoo, Angry Anderson. Big Foot, aka Andamooka Buggy, is on display at the National Motor Museum in Birdwood.
 1985 'Opal Miner: An Opal Mining Simulation Game' made by Colin L Fahey.
 1981 Andamooka featured in Jack Absalom's Outback on the 2 Network.
 1975 Olympic Dam ore body is discovered. Geologists of the Western Mining Corporation discovered the vast orebodies of copper, uranium, silver, and gold.
 1970 was the first Andamooka Opal Festival.
 1970 the iconic US band The Platters perform in Andamooka.
 1966 The Mystrys played in Andamooka.  Accompanying them was all-girl band The Kontacts, whose gimmick was a male singer known as Tony Satan. The Mystrys wore green velvet hoods whenever they appeared in public and did not divulge their true identities. They claimed to come from another planet and adopted preposterous alien-sounding names – Ankharr, Kuff (who claimed to be 347 years old), Zoarg and GMX. They also claimed there was a fifth member of the group called Finstar – but he was invisible.
 1966  Australian TV series 'Hunter' filmed episodes in Andamooka and Woomera.
 1965 Bill MacDougall, "The Sheriff of White Dam' Bill settles in White Dam moving from Woomera.
 1963 The Opal Restaurant (later the Opal Hotel) is opened.
 1967 Inge and Rudi Duke open Dukes Guest House. 
 1967 The first commuter air service took place on 2 March 1967 between Adelaide, Andamooka, and Coober Pedy. Opal Air uses an 8-seater, twin engine Cessna 402 to run 3 services a week between Adelaide and Andamooka.
 1962 Steve Smirnios bought Tuckabox site from a series of photos and travelled over 2,000 km from Sydney to Andamooka.
 1950 Artist Alex Mendelssohn migrated from war-torn Hungary to Andamooka in the early 1950s. "For Alex Mendelssohn, the isolated outback community built upon red earth, nicknamed 'Mars on Earth' presented the freedom he craved, far away from the shackles of politics, war, and bureaucracy of his early years. In a radio interview 6.30 with George Negus, Alex expressed the reason he called Andamooka his home: "You're not controlled by councils and regulations and laws and rules. You do whatever you bloody like." Where on earth you got places like Andamooka left now? Free...whatever you want to bloody do or go wherever you want to bloody go. Free from all the bands and chains... It's a magnificent feeling.

Housing
The underground portions provided excellent insulation against the extremes of the outside temperatures. Being unsurveyed, occupancy was determined by tenuous Miners' Right. That situation deterred capital investment and so in the 1970s Andamooka was essentially a declining shanty town. Civic affairs, such as they were, were organised by a citizens' progress association. Their limited activities mainly related to electricity generation and supply, and maintaining the dirt airstrip in case the Flying Doctor was needed. All roads were unsealed tracks, while the main street was a dry rocky creek bed (unless there was a rare thunderstorm). There were few government agencies. Until a police station was opened in 1966, the police made routine weekly visits from Woomera, a mostly military town that supported the Woomera Test Range and Joint Defense Facility Nurrungar. Unless there was an emergency in between these visits, the isolated settlement was self-policing.

In the 1980s, with an influx of work through the advent and development of the nearby mine at Olympic Dam, more houses were built and transported in. Many of the town's houses came from the demobilisation of Woomera. A transformation then took place. Not many people still live in the traditional dugout-style houses of old, although remnants of the town's past remain in the main street, with the cottages of old miners dug into the side of the hill in the main street still standing

Climate
Annual rainfall is extremely low, even by Australian standards, with the average in the region just 160 mm per year. The climate is very arid, with daytime temperatures in summer regularly topping 40 °C (104 °F) and night temperatures in winter often dropping close to zero (32 °F).

References

Far North (South Australia)
Mining towns in South Australia
Places in the unincorporated areas of South Australia